Tadeusz Pacuła (25 July 1932 – 16 May 1984) was a Polish basketball player. He competed in the men's tournament at the 1960 Summer Olympics.

References

1932 births
1984 deaths
Polish men's basketball players
Olympic basketball players of Poland
Basketball players at the 1960 Summer Olympics
Sportspeople from Kraków